Susan Amero (born 17 April 1976) is a female Ugandan member of parliament for the Amuria district, she is a member of the ruling National Resistance Movement political party

Education 
Amero completed her Primary Leaving Examination at Rock View Primary School in 1989 in Tororo district. In 1993, she finished her Uganda Certificate of Education at St. Francis School for the Blind in Madera. She completed her Uganda Advanced Certificate from Mbale Secondary School  in 1996.

Between 1996 and 1997, Amero completed certificates in Tour and Travel Operator and IATA/UFTAA at Airway Tours and Travel, Switzerland. In 2007, she graduated with a Bachelor of International Relations and Diplomacy at Nkumba University, a private university in Entebbe, Uganda. She also completed her Master of Arts in International Relations at Nkumba University.

Work 
In 1998, Amero worked as a sales executive and receptionist. Between 1999 and 2009, she was a VIP assistant at the Ugandan Civil Aviation Authority. From 2011 to date, she has been a member of parliament.

Committees 
Amero serves on the following committees in the Ugandan parliament:

 National Economy
 Presidential Affairs (vice-chairperson)

See also 

 List of members of the eleventh Parliament of Uganda.
 Abubakar Jeje Odongo
 Musa Francis Ecweru
 Amuria District

References

External links 

 Website of the Parliament of Uganda

Living people
1976 births
Members of the Parliament of Uganda
National Resistance Movement politicians
Women members of the Parliament of Uganda
21st-century Ugandan politicians
21st-century Ugandan women politicians